Riverside Stadium was a multi-purpose sports arena with a roller rink located in Washington D.C.

History 
Riverside Stadium was opened to the public in 1938.  In the early 1940s, the stadium played host to several "ice carnivals" and was considered to be an important venue to showcase competitive skating skills.  Riverside Stadium was demolished to make way for the construction of the larger landmark, the National Cultural Center.  The new stadium was renamed in 1964 as the John F. Kennedy Center for the Performing Arts.

Hosted porting events 
 Eastern Regional Championships of the Roller Skating Rinks of the United States, May 30-June 1, 1948.
 Roller Skating Rink's Operators Association (RSROA) American Championship, July 11–16, 1949.
 Amateur Roller Skating Championship of the Roller Skating Rink's Operators Association (RSROA), July 11–16, 1949.

Non-sporting events hosted 
 Democratic Forum conducted by women's division of the Democratic National Committee, on the evening of May 3, 1940.

It has been reported in various United States Supreme Court's documents that the stadium was used by Central Intelligence Agency between 1961 and 1963.

References 

Demolished buildings and structures in Washington, D.C.
Defunct sports venues in Washington, D.C.